The NCHC Forward of the Year is an annual award given out at the conclusion of the National Collegiate Hockey Conference regular season to the best forward in the conference as voted by the coaches of each NCHC team.

The Forward of the Year was first awarded in 2014.

Award winners

Winners by school

Winners by position

See also
NCHC Awards

References

External links

College ice hockey trophies and awards in the United States
National Collegiate Hockey Conference